is a town located in Aomori Prefecture, Japan. , the town had an estimated population of 8,951 in 4394 households, and a population density of 26 persons per km2.

Geography
Ajigasawa is in Nishitsugaru District, Aomori  southwestern corner of Aomori Prefecture on the border with Akita Prefecture, facing the Sea of Japan to the northwest, and the slopes of  Mount Iwaki to the southeast. Part of the town is located within the borders of the Shirakami-Sanchi, a UNESCO World Heritage Site, and some coastal areas of the town are within the Tsugaru Quasi-National Park. The Akaishi Keiryū Anmon no Taki Prefectural Natural Park is also partly located within the borders of Ajigasawa.

Neighbouring municipalities
Aomori Prefecture
Hirosaki
Tsugaru
Fukaura
Nishimeya
Akita Prefecture
Happō
Fujisato

Climate
The town has a cold humid continental climate (Köppen Dfb) characterized by warm short summers and long cold winters with heavy snowfall. The average annual temperature in Ajigasawa is 10.7 °C. The average annual rainfall is 1480 mm with September as the wettest month. The temperatures are highest on average in August, at around 22.9 °C, and lowest in January, at around -3.1 °C.

Demographics
Per Japanese census data, the population of Ajigasawa has decreased by more than half over the past 60 years.

History
Oura Mitsunobu, the founder of the Tsugaru clan, settled in Tanesato (now part of Ajigasawa) in 1491, which developed into a port for the Tsugaru region. The area around Ajigasawa was controlled by the Tsugaru clan of Hirosaki Domain during the Edo period.  Ajigasawa became a village in Nishitsugaru District, Aomori with the establishment of the modern municipalities system on April 1, 1889, and was elevated to town status on March 31, 1955 by annexing the neighboring villages of Akaishi, Nakamura, Narusawa and Maido.

Government
Ajigasawa has a mayor-council form of government with a directly elected mayor and a unicameral town legislature of 12 members. Nishitsugaru District contributes one member to the Aomori Prefectural Assembly. In terms of national politics, the town is part of Aomori 3rd district of the lower house of the Diet of Japan.

Economy
The economy of Ajigasawa is heavily dependent on agriculture (rice and horticulture) and on commercial fishing, especially for squid. Other species commonly caught in the local waters include the  Japanese flounder, Japanese horse mackerel, Atka mackerel, red snapper, cod, angler fish, octopus, sharks and salmon.

Education
Ajigasawa has two public elementary schools and one public junior high schools operated by the town government and one public high school operated by the Aomori Prefectural Board of Education.

The Shirakami Nature School is a non-profit organization that is housed in a 19th-century wooden building that was used as an elementary school until the spring of 2003. The Shirakami Nature School hosts a wide variety of environmental education including classroom activities and open-air classes to people of all ages.

Transportation

Railway
 East Japan Railway Company (JR East) - Gonō Line
  -  -

Highway
  Tsugaru Expressway

International relations
 – São Sebastião, São Paulo, Brazil since October 26, 1984

Local attractions
 The Kikuya squid stand on the outskirts of town is the home of Wasao, an Akita dog that garnered nationwide attention after starring in a 2011 feature film which was filmed on location in the town.
Aomori Spring Ski Resort (formerly known as NAQUA Shirakami Ski Resort).
Aomori Spring Golf Club
Rockwood Hotel & Spa
Ajigasawa Beach is about a ten-minute walk from the train station and has both grass and sand areas with a view of the Sea of Japan.
Umi No Eki “Wando” is a collection of stores, much like a market, that sells local goods directly from the farmers and fishermen. The products sold here are all local, and very fresh.
Shirakami-Sanchi – UNESCO World Heritage Site
Otaka-yama park is open to the public and includes a multipurpose stadium, tennis courts, amphitheater, go-carts and an elaborate playground.
, gets its name from its appearance; it looks like a standing black bear. It is one of Japan’s Top 100 Waterfalls.
Tanesato Castle ruins, a National Historic Site*Akaishi Keiryū Anmon no Taki Prefectural Natural Park

Noted people from Ajigasawa
Hiyori Kon, sumo wrestler
Homarefuji Yoshiyuki, sumo wrestler
Mainoumi Shuhei, sumo wrestler

Gallery

References

External links

  
 Shirakami Nature School Mountain Guide

 
Towns in Aomori Prefecture
Populated coastal places in Japan